The 2020 Scheldeprijs was the 108th edition of the Scheldeprijs road cycling one day race. It was originally scheduled to be held on 8 April 2020, but due to the COVID-19 pandemic, it was postponed to 14 October 2020. It was a 1.Pro event on the 2020 UCI Europe Tour and the 2020 UCI ProSeries.

In previous years, the race course has included sections in both Belgium and the Netherlands, and was originally planned to start in the Dutch city of Terneuzen and finish in the Belgian city of Schoten. However, due to a spike in COVID-19 cases in the Netherlands, the race course was altered to 10 laps of a  course in and around Schoten.

Australian rider Caleb Ewan of  won the sprint comfortably by a margin of a few bike lengths ahead of the rest of the field. As a result of Ackermann's relegation, Niccolò Bonifazio and Bryan Coquard were promoted to second and third place, respectively.

Teams
Fifteen of the nineteen UCI WorldTeams, nine UCI ProTeams, and one UCI Continental team made up the twenty-five teams that participated in the race. Of the 170 riders in the race, only 12 did not finish. 

UCI WorldTeams

 
 
 
 
 
 
 
 
 
 
 
 
 
 
 

UCI ProTeams

 
 
 
 
 
 
 
 
 

UCI Continental Teams

Result

References

2020 UCI Europe Tour
2020 UCI ProSeries
2020
2020 in Belgian sport
October 2020 sports events in Belgium
Cycling events postponed due to the COVID-19 pandemic